John Ewart (14 May 1858 – 5 August 1939) was a New Zealand doctor and hospital superintendent. He was born in Ecclefechan, Dumfriesshire, Scotland on 14 May 1858.

References

1858 births
1939 deaths
New Zealand hospital administrators
People from Dumfries
New Zealand surgeons